Victim Of Geography is a 1993 collection of Billy Bragg's previous albums Talking with the Taxman about Poetry and Workers Playtime, originally released in 1986 and 1988 respectively.

Track listing
All tracks written by Billy Bragg, except where noted

"Greetings to the New Brunette" – 3:29
"Train Train" (Zenon DeFleur) – 2:11
"The Marriage" – 2:30
"Ideology" – 3:27
"Levi Stubbs' Tears" – 3:28
"Honey, I'm a Big Boy Now" – 4:05
"There Is Power in a Union" (Bragg, Traditional) – 2:47
"Help Save the Youth of America" – 2:45
"Wishing the Days Away" – 2:28
"The Passion" – 2:52
"The Warmest Room" – 3:55
"The Home Front" – 4:09
"She's Got A New Spell" – 3:24
"Must I Paint You A Picture" – 5:31
"Tender Comrade" – 2:49
"The Price I Pay" – 3:33
"Little Time Bomb" – 2:17
"Rotting On Remand" – 3:37
"Valentine's Day Is Over" – 4:53
"Life With The Lions" – 3:06
"The Only One" – 3:25
"The Short Answer" – 4:58
"Waiting For The Great Leap Forwards" – 4:34

Footnotes

Billy Bragg compilation albums
1993 compilation albums
Cooking Vinyl compilation albums